Saarde is a village in Saarde Parish, Pärnu County in southwestern Estonia. It is located just south of the town of Kilingi-Nõmme, the administrative centre of the municipality. As of 2011 Census, the settlement's population was 318.

Saarde is the location of St. Cathrine's church, built 1858-1859 on the site of previous church from 1684.

References

Villages in Pärnu County